Rosebud is a historic diner building at 381 Summer Street in Somerville, Massachusetts, near Davis Square.

The diner was built in 1941 by the Worcester Lunch Car Company for the Nichols and Perivolaris families. It was added to the National Register of Historic Places in 1999.

The original lunch car was 400 square feet. At some point, an addition of over 3000 square feet was made to the back containing a full kitchen (as opposed to the original small grill area behind the counter) and additional seating. 

In 2013, after 40 years of the family's ownership, Evangelos Nichols sold the Rosebud to Martin Bloom.  Bloom, the founder of a chain of Italian restaurants called Vinny Testa's and owner of the Mission Oak Grill, promised to leave the exterior untouched. however the original interior was completely removed and the business name changed to "Rosebud American Kitchen and Bar", reflecting the shift from a diner-style business model to a mid-tier table service restaurant.

See also
National Register of Historic Places listings in Somerville, Massachusetts

References

External links

Commercial buildings completed in 1941
Restaurants on the National Register of Historic Places in Massachusetts
Buildings and structures in Somerville, Massachusetts
Tourist attractions in Middlesex County, Massachusetts
Diners on the National Register of Historic Places
Diners in Massachusetts
Restaurants established in 1941
National Register of Historic Places in Somerville, Massachusetts
1941 establishments in Massachusetts
2013 mergers and acquisitions